Amanda Augustus (born January 19, 1978) is a former professional tennis player from the United States.

Biography
Augustus, who grew up in Los Angeles County, attended UC Berkeley and was one of the most successful tennis players in California Golden Bears history. She received All-Pac-10 honors in each of her four seasons. In 1998 and 1999 she teamed up with Amy Jensen to claim back to back NCAA doubles titles.

A left-handed player, Augustus turned professional after graduating from UC Berkeley in 1999.

She played on tour primarily as a doubles player and reached a top ranking of 82 in the world, with 18 ITF doubles titles. Her best performance on the WTA Tour were semi-final appearances in the doubles at the 2001 Tashkent Open, 2002 Canberra Women's Classic and 2002 Bank of the West Classic in Stanford. She featured in the main draw of all four grand slam tournaments. Both of her wins in grand slam matches were over seeded pairings. Partnering Jennifer Embry at the 2002 French Open, the pair beat 12th seeds Janet Lee and Wynne Prakusya. At the 2002 US Open she and Embry had a win over Amanda Coetzer and Lori McNeil, who were also seeded 12th. She played her final year on the professional tour in 2005.

Formerly a head coach at the University of Michigan, since 2007 she has headed women's tennis back at her alma mater UC Berkeley.

ITF Circuit finals

Doubles (18–16)

References

External links
 
 

1978 births
Living people
American female tennis players
American tennis coaches
Tennis people from California
California Golden Bears women's tennis players
California Golden Bears women's tennis coaches
Michigan Wolverines women's tennis coaches